Hotteok, sometimes called Hoeddeok, is a type of filled pancake; and is a popular street food in South Korea. It originates in  China, when it was first brought into Korea from China during the 19th century.

Preparation 
The dough for hotteok is made from wheat flour, water, milk, sugar, and yeast. The dough is allowed to rise for several hours. Handful-sized balls of this stiff dough are filled with a sweet mixture, which may contain brown sugar, honey, chopped peanuts, and cinnamon. The filled dough is then placed on a greased griddle, and pressed flat into a large circle, this is done with a stainless steel circle and wooden handle as it cooks.

In South Korea, ready-made dry hotteok mix is commercially available in plastic packages. The mix also comes with a filling consisting of brown sugar and ground peanuts or sesame seeds.

History 
The hotteok is derived from the tang bing (meaning "sweet pancake" in Chinese). In the 1920s, many Chinese merchants settled in Korea and sold these tang bing. The Koreans called it "hotteok" which means "barbarian's rice cake". As Korea was under Japanese rule, the Japanese called it "shina pan" meaning "Chinese bread".

It is generally believed that the Chinese merchants who immigrated to and settled down in Korea around the late 19th century made and sold hotteok at cheap prices, which helped spread the dish throughout Korea. Unlike many Chinese pancakes, which often contain savory meat fillings, hotteoks usually have been stuffed with sweet fillings, to suit Koreans' culinary tastes.

Varieties 
The types of hotteok have been changing continuously although many favour the traditional cinnamon and peanut filling. Many variations have developed since the early 21st century, such as green tea hotteok,  pink bokbunja hotteok, corn hotteok, pizza hotteok and more.
Along with that many vendors now sell yachae-hotteok made with japchae and vegetables. Commercially produced hotteok products are developed and sold by companies such as Samyang, Ottogi, and CJ. Such products are designed to be cooked at home.

Nutrition 
Hotteok is usually eaten during the winter season. Due to its high sugar content, a single hotteok may have as many as 230 calories.

Phrases using hotteok
Koreans say "The hotteok store is burning (호떡집에 불났다.)" to refer to noisy situations. It is believed that the phrase originated from the thought of Chinese merchants arguing over the reason of a fire at their hotteok stall.

See also 
 Korean Chinese cuisine
 Chinese cuisine
 Hoppang
 Bungeoppang
 List of Korean desserts
 Street food in South Korea
 List of pancakes
 List of stuffed dishes

References

External links 

Two variations of hotteok
Hotteok recipe
Hotteok recipe with video
Article about the origin of Hotteok and Hobbang 

Korean pancakes
Korean snack food
Street food in South Korea
Stuffed dishes
Chinese cuisine
Korean Chinese cuisine